The Starkey International Institute for Household Management, commonly known as Starkey and nicknamed Butler Boot Camp, is a vocational school for Household Manager butlers founded in 1990 by Mary Louise Starkey and based in a Georgian-style mansion in Denver, Colorado, United States.

Training costs upwards of $13,000,and involves three main programs related to the Private Service position a Household Management program (eight weeks long), an Estate Management program (four weeks long), and a Service Management System program (one week long and also offered via correspondence) The school graduates over 60 trainees a year. As of 1999, the school had planned a satellite school in the Washington, D.C. area.

Members of the US military report most of the enlisted aides serving US Generals and Admirals have been trained by Starkey. It trains them to understand international protocol for entertaining visiting dignitaries, cooking skills, and understanding overall household service management. Among the school's regulations are a ban on the use of given names and the wearing of a uniform. Starkey emphasizes personal boundaries and professionalism. The school prefers the term "household manager" as a gender-neutral equivalent of "butler". The school initially used  The Remains of the Day  author Kazuo Ishiguro as a "model for butlering".

Today's Estate and Household Managers are authorities on service and well educated, demand is particularly strong. According to one expert, the U.S. was experiencing an unprecedented increase in the number of households that could afford a Household Manager . At this time demand far exceeded supply, and the school itself has a long waiting list.

This school and its owner was the subject of an investigative journalism article by John P. Davidson in Harper's Magazine in January 2014.

Controversies 

In 2001, the school organized a "butler's convention" in Denver, with Paul Burrell as a keynote speaker. After the former butler to Princess Diana began speaking openly in his dispute with the royal family, Starkey was said to have criticized him for "betraying his ethics". She says the lessons from Mr. Burrell was an important one. She said if a client makes your situation intolerable, the only ethical choice was to quit.

In June 2008 Mary Starkey pleaded guilty to assaulting one of her students at the institute, Lisa Kirkpatrick, in Denver District Court. Starkey was later cleared of any wrongdoing.
The original incident occurred in January 2007 when Starkey was observed by several students to yell at Kirkpatrick as well as physically assault her. The reason given was that Starkey did not like Kirkpatrick's appearance, although according to several eyewitnesses in addition to a number of prior students, this type of behavior was common for Starkey during 'high stress' days at the school, such as graduation or formal dinner exercises.

Sometime after the assault, students at the Institute confronted Starkey. They expressed their displeasure and concerns, including: Starkey's inappropriate behavior toward students and employees; They were anxious because they discovered the pin each successful graduate would receive — a pin symbolizing that they were all official, Starkey Certified Household Managers and ready to supervise the upkeep and administration of some of the most glamorous estates in the world — had little real-world value, in addition to Starkey's misrepresentation of percentage of graduates placed, which also took into consideration military students who were already employed.

Mary Starkey's legal saga was first reported in Denver's local tabloid Westword.

Sources

References

External links 
 Starkey website
 Mary Starkey

Educational institutions established in 1990
Education in Denver
1990 establishments in Colorado